The Second Ministerial Conference of the World Trade Organization was held in Geneva, Switzerland between 18 and 20 May 1998.

References

See also
 Doha Declaration

World Trade Organization ministerial conferences
Diplomatic conferences in Switzerland
20th-century diplomatic conferences
1998 conferences
1998 in international relations
History of Geneva
20th century in Geneva
May 1998 events in Europe